Xyleborus may refer to:

 Xyleborus (beetle), a genus of bark beetles
 Xyleborus (lichen), a genus of lichens